Kępiny may refer to the following places:
Kępiny, Lubusz Voivodeship (west Poland)
Kępiny, Masovian Voivodeship (east-central Poland)
Kępiny, West Pomeranian Voivodeship (north-west Poland)